The WTA Seattle is a defunct WTA Tour affiliated tennis tournament played from 1977 to 1982.  It was held in Seattle, Washington in the United States and played on indoor carpet courts from 1977 to 1982. The tournament was known as the Virginia Slims of Seattle in 1977 and 1978 and for the remainder of its existence, 1979 through 1982, was called the Avon Championships of Seattle.

Results

Singles

Doubles

References

External links
 WTA Tour history

Carpet court tennis tournaments
Defunct tennis tournaments in the United States
Indoor tennis tournaments
Recurring events disestablished in 1982
Recurring sporting events established in 1977
Sports in Seattle
Virginia Slims tennis tournaments
WTA Tour
1977 establishments in Washington (state)
1982 disestablishments in Washington (state)
Tennis in Washington (state)
History of women in Washington (state)